Göttingen is an electoral constituency (German: Wahlkreis) represented in the Bundestag. It elects one member via first-past-the-post voting. Under the current constituency numbering system, it is designated as constituency 53. It is located in southern Lower Saxony, comprising most of the Göttingen district.

Göttingen was created for the inaugural 1949 federal election. Since 2021, it has been represented by Andreas Philippi of the Social Democratic Party (SPD).

Geography
Göttingen is located in southern Lower Saxony. As of the 2021 federal election, it comprises the district of Göttingen excluding the municipalities of Bad Grund, Osterode am Harz, and Walkenried, the Samtgemeinde of Hattorf am Harz, and the Harz area.

History
Göttingen was created in 1949, then known as Göttingen – Münden. It acquired its current name in the 1965 election. In the inaugural Bundestag election, it was Lower Saxony constituency 34 in the numbering system. From 1953 through 1961, it was number 56. From 1965 through 1998, it was number 49. In the 2002 and 2005 elections, it was number 53. In the 2009 election, it was number 54. Since the 2013 election, it has been number 53.

Originally, the constituency comprised the independent city of Göttingen and the districts of Göttingen and Münden. In the 1965 through 1972 elections, it comprised the districts of Göttingen, Münden, and Duderstadt, and the municipality of Fürstenhagen from the Northeim district. In the 1976 election, it comprised the Göttingen and the municipality of Fürstenhagen from the Northeim district. In the 1980 through 1998 elections, it comprised only the district of Göttingen. In the 2002 though 2013 elections, it comprised the district of Göttingen and the municipalities of Bad Lauterberg, Bad Sachsa, and Herzberg am Harz from the district of Osterode. Osterode district was merged into Göttingen ahead of the 2017 election, but the constituency's borders did not change.

Members
The constituency was first held by Arno Hennig of the Social Democratic Party (SPD), who served from 1949 to 1953. Walter Drechsel of the Free Democratic Party (FDP) was elected in 1953 and served a single term. Franz Blücher, Vice-Chancellor of Germany and former chairman of the FDP, was elected as candidate for the German Party in 1957. He died in 1959, and was succeeded by Günter Frede of the SPD in the 1961 election. The Christian Democratic Union (CDU) won the constituency in 1965, and Willy Steinmetz served a single term as representative. Günter Wichert was elected in 1969 and served two terms. Fellow SPD member Lothar Curdt served from 1976 to 1983. In 1983, Hans Hugo Klein won the constituency for the CDU, and was succeeded in 1987 by Rita Süssmuth, also of the CDU. Süssmuth served as President of the Bundestag from 1988 to 1998. The SPD regained the constituency with candidate Inge Wettig-Danielmeier in 1998. In 2005, Thomas Oppermann was elected representative. He was re-elected in 2009, 2013, and 2017. Oppermann died in October 2020. Andreas Philippi was elected as his successor in 2021.

Election results

2021 election

2017 election

2013 election

2009 election

References

Federal electoral districts in Lower Saxony
1949 establishments in West Germany
Constituencies established in 1949